Saitopolemos is a customary celebration that take place in the Greek city of Messini during Easter. According to legend, its roots can be traced back to the Greek War of Independence in the 1820s, and especially to a battle the Greeks fought against the army of the Egyptian Sultan Ibrahim Pasha. However, this explanation is disputed. The 19th century Greek Romantic tradition used to place the nativity of the majority of Greek customs in the period of Turkish occupation (1453-1821). The biggest argument against the traditional view is the fact that the celebration takes place during Easter week, whereas most historians agree that the events the traditional songs refer to did not occur during that time of year. Easter celebration is often connected with fires so the celebration's roots can be traced back to the first Christian societies.  

The celebration takes place in Kalamata Metropolitan Stadium where the participants are divided into 10 to 15 teams. Each team consists of 15 to 30 people, mainly young boys. The preparation for the event begins weeks before Easter festivities with young people preparing their saites for the event. A saita is a circular object filled with flammable material. When the celebration begins the players light up their saites and the stadium glows with flame. The custom is controversial because it is very dangerous. The Greek media have been highly critical of it, and there have been calls for its termination. But the locals insist that the custom is a tradition they inherited from their ancestors. Kalamata's mayor and upper priest have been supportive of the event.

Greek culture
Easter traditions in Greece
Spring traditions
Messenia